The Calabrian black squirrel (Sciurus meridionalis) is a species of tree squirrel in the genus Sciurus, endemic to the forests of the regions of Calabria and Basilicata, in the south of the Italian Peninsula.

Taxonomy
It has long been considered a subspecies of the red squirrel (Sciurus vulgaris), but studies published in 2009–2017 revealed that it is unique in both genetics and appearance, leading to its recognition as a distinct species.

Description
The Calabrian black squirrel is an arboreal animal that generally resembles the red squirrel in its behavior. Unlike the highly variable red squirrel, the Calabrian black squirrel is monomorphic (not variable in appearance), being very dark brown to blackish with contrasting white underparts. Compared to red squirrels of northern Italy, the Calabrian black squirrel is also significantly larger, weighing  or on average about 35% more.

Habitat
The Calabrian black squirrel lives in mixed forests in highlands, and its nests are often placed in pine or oak trees. It mostly occurs near black pine, as the seeds are an important food source. The northern limit of its range has been northern Pollino, but it is slowly spreading north to the Lucan Apennines (Basilicata region). The Calabrian black squirrel has a stable population, but its small range means that it likely qualifies for near threatened or perhaps vulnerable. The most serious threat is possibly the Finlayson's squirrel, which has been introduced near its range.

References 

Mammals described in 1907
Rodents of Europe
Sciurus

Endemic fauna of Italy